Performance art is a performance presented to an audience within a fine art context, traditionally interdisciplinary. Performance may be either scripted or unscripted, random or carefully orchestrated; spontaneous or otherwise carefully planned with or without audience participation. 

This article lists notable performance artists.

A
Marina Abramović
Vito Acconci
Derrick Adams
Theo Adams
Terry Adkins
Laurie Anderson
Eleanor Antin
Marcel·lí Antúnez Roca
Marilyn Arsem
Ron Athey
Abel Azcona

B
Franko B
Magali Babin
Gretchen Baer
Blažej Baláž
Matthew Barney
Artur Barrio
Vanessa Beecroft
Katherine Behar
Rebecca Belmore
Joseph Beuys
Björk
Black Market International (BMI)
Nicole Blackman
Guy Bleus
Mark Bloch
Blue Man Group
Eric Bogosian
Kate Bornstein
Leigh Bowery
George Brecht
Alexander Brener
Stuart Brisley
Robert Delford Brown
Günter Brus
Chris Burden
Nia Burks
Józef Bury
James Lee Byars

C
Cabaret Voltaire
Meryn Cadell
Sophie Calle
Lisa Crystal Carver (Lisa Suckdog)
Giuseppe Chiari
Katherine Chronis
Yuan Chai and Jian Jun Xi
Marko Ciciliani
Keith Cole
Papo Colo
Janani Cooray
Costes
Wayne Coyne of the Flaming Lips
COUM Transmissions (later Throbbing Gristle)

D
D Underbelly
Bill Dan
Dancenoise
Vaginal Davis
Danielle Dax
Robin Deacon
Danny Devos
Jess Dobkin
Marco Donnarumma
Doorika
Die Tödliche Doris
John Duncan

E
Rafa Esparza
EXIT (members Penny Rimbaud and Gee Vaucher later formed Crass)
Valie Export

F
Zachary Fabri
Deej Fabyc
John Fare
Brian Feldman
Esther Ferrer
Karen Finley
Andrea Fraser
Coco Fusco

G
Diamanda Galás
Regina José Galindo
Richard Gallo
Harry Gamboa, Jr.
Cheri Gaulke
Jochen Gerz
Gilbert and George
Gob Squad
Jack Goldstein
Guillermo Gomez-Peña
Hedwig Gorski
Annabel Guérédrat and Henri Tauliaut
Nadia Granados
Paul Grégoire
Johannes Grenzfurthner
Peter Grzybowski

H
Lyn Hagan
David Hammons
Trenton Doyle Hancock
Lyle Ashton Harris
Maren Hassinger
Vladimír Havlík
Andreas Heusser
Amy Hill
EJ Hill
Tehching Hsieh
Dick Higgins
Zhang Huan
Holly Hughes
Dan Hurlin

I
Industry of the Ordinary

J
Joan Jonas
Jelili Atiku
Kim Jones
Juha
Juliacks
Miranda July
Colette Justine
Zuzanna Janin

K
Alex Kahn
Istvan Kantor
Allan Kaprow
Andy Kaufman
Jonathon Keats
Mike Kelley
The Kipper Kids
Kimsooja
Ragnar Kjartansson
Norbert Klassen
Yves Klein
Alison Knowles
Mitchell Kriegman
Yayoi Kusama
Helene Kvint
Dan Kwong
Siglinde Kallnbach

L
Tony Labat
LaBeouf, Rönkkö & Turner
Suzanne Lacy
Maria Lalou
LasTesis
Lennie Lee
Jorge de León
Shaun El C. Leonardo
David Leslie
André Éric Létourneau
Roberta Lima
Kalup Linzy
Artyom Loskutov
James Luna
Lydia Lunch

M
Alastair MacLennan
Ann Magnuson
Miki Malör
Diane Mantzaris
Piero Manzoni
Deb Margolin
María Evelia Marmolejo
Gordon Matta-Clark
Paul McCarthy
Martha McDonald
Mark McGowan
Rita McKeough
Dave McKenzie
Elle Mehrmand
Ana Mendieta
Gabrielle Miller
Tom Miller
Orlando Mohorovic
Linda Montano
Frank Moore
Charlotte Moorman
Mr. Pacman
Otto Muehl
Tom Murrin

N
Mem Nahadr
Senga Nengudi
Ugo Nespolo
Lane Nishikawa
Hermann Nitsch
Tameka Norris
Nsumi

O
Martin O'Brien
Lorraine O’Grady
Pat Oleszko
Marisa Olson
Roman Ondák
Yoko Ono
Dennis Oppenheim
Jill Orr
Orlan
Tanja Ostojic
Clifford Owens

P
Nam June Paik
 Andrea Pagnes
Panamarenko
Gina Pane
Rebecca Patek
Sarah Jane Pell 
Adam Pendleton
PINK de Thierry
Adrian Piper
William Pope.L
Genesis P-Orridge
Michael Portnoy

R
Walid Raad
Rammellzee
Nelda Ramos
Charles Recher
Eric-Paul Riege
Rachel Rosenthal
Kira O' Reilly
Jesusa Rodríguez
Martha Rosler
Monica Ross

S
Bryan Lewis Saunders
Carolee Schneemann
HA Schult
Rudolf Schwarzkogler
Erica Scourti
Arleen Schloss
Dread Scott
Tino Sehgal
David Sherry (artist)
Shu Yang
Willoughby Sharp
Shozo Shimamoto
Lián Amaris Sifuentes
Xaviera Simmons
Vasan Sitthiket
Joey Skaggs
Barbara T. Smith
Jack Smith
Michael Smith
Annegret Soltau
Antonieta Sosa
Annie Sprinkle
Stevie Starr
Stelarc
Verena Stenke
Andre Stitt
Angela Su
Survival Research Laboratories
Melati Suryodarmo

T
Reverend Billy and the Church of Life After Shopping
Elena Tejada-Herrera
Slaven Tolj
Julie Tolentino
Alessandra Torres
Carmelita Tropicana
Natasha Tsakos
Wu Tsang
Artur Tajber

V
Armand Vaillancourt
David Van Tieghem
Wolf Vostell
VestAndPage
Victor Dada

W
Monika Weiss
Lee Wen
Hannah Wilke
David Wojnarowicz
The World Famous Bushman
John M. White

X
Márcia X

Y
Nil Yalter
Yamantaka // Sonic Titan
Yang Zhichao
Yes Men
Hennessy Youngman (aka Jayson Musson)

Z
Vahram Zaryan
Zhu Yu
Zheng Lianjie

 
Performance artists
Performance artists